Without a Trace is a police procedural television show, which was originally broadcast on CBS from September 26, 2002 to May 19, 2009. The series, set in New York City, is about a fictitious full-time FBI missing persons unit. Most episodes follow the search for an individual where it is of great importance that the person be found quickly. The stories also focus on the personal lives of the team members to show how their different experiences give them insight, and sometimes traumatic reactions, to certain cases.

A total of 160 episodes were produced over 7 seasons. The first two seasons have been released on DVD in region 1. In region 2 seasons 1-6 are available on DVD. Seasons 1-5 are available on DVD in region 4. No seasons were released on HD DVD and as of January 2018 there has not been an announcement about a release of the show on Blu-ray.

Series overview

Episodes

Season 1 (2002–03)

Season 2 (2003–04)

Season 3 (2004–05)

Season 4 (2005–06)

Season 5 (2006–07)

Season 6 (2007–08) 

"Where and Why" is the conclusion of a crossover that begins on the CSI: Crime Scene Investigation episode "Who and What".

Season 7 (2008–09)

Home media

References

Lists of American crime drama television series episodes